Adele Marsiletti  (born 7 November 1964) is an Italian footballer who played as a midfielder for the Italy women's national football team. She was part of the team at the inaugural 1991 FIFA Women's World Cup. On club level she played for Reggiana in Italy.

References

External links
 

1964 births
Living people
Italian women's footballers
Italy women's international footballers
Place of birth missing (living people)
1991 FIFA Women's World Cup players
Women's association football midfielders
A.S.D. Reggiana Calcio Femminile players
A.C.F. Trani 80 players